The Maskeliya Oya (translated into Maskeliya River from Sinhala) is a major upstream tributary of the Kelani River. The river is heavily used for hydroelectric power generation.

Features on the river 
The following table lists the major features along the Maskeliya Oya, from its origins further upstream. Some dams hold back water, and transfer a percentage of it to hydroelectric power stations located further downstream, via tunnels.

See also 
 List of dams and reservoirs in Sri Lanka
 List of rivers of Sri Lanka

References 

Rivers of Sri Lanka